Madina Kazakova (born 16 June 1976) is a Russian Paralympic judoka. In 2004, she won the gold medal in the women's 63 kg event at the 2004 Summer Paralympics held in Athens, Greece. In the final, she defeated Silke Huettler of Germany. In 2008, she won one of the bronze medals in the same event at the 2008 Summer Paralympics held in Beijing, China.

References 

Living people
1976 births
Place of birth missing (living people)
Russian female judoka
Paralympic judoka of Russia
Paralympic gold medalists for Russia
Paralympic bronze medalists for Russia
Paralympic medalists in judo
Judoka at the 2004 Summer Paralympics
Judoka at the 2008 Summer Paralympics
Medalists at the 2004 Summer Paralympics
Medalists at the 2008 Summer Paralympics
20th-century Russian women
21st-century Russian women